Tibetan Refugee Self Help Centre in Darjeeling, India, is a rehabilitation centre for the Tibetan refugees in the Darjeeling Himalayan hill region. It was established on 2 October 1959, after they followed Dalai Lama and escaped from Tibet. The production of Tibetan handicraft is the centre's main activity.

Location

It is located at hillside Lebong in Darjeeling District of West Bengal. The temperature variation is from 17°-1.5 °C, along with an annual  rainfall.

History

Situated at Lebong and locally known as Hermitage, the Tibetan Refugee Self Help Centre (TRSHC) came into existence on 2 October 1959. In 1959, funds raised from local charity led to the starting of this centre by Zhu Dan (wife of Gyalo Thondup). The place initially provided emergency relief to Tibetan refugees who had come through a hazardous trek over the Himalayas into India. The Hill-side had a special significance for Tibetans, because the Thirteenth Dalai Lama had spent his exile in India from 1910 to 1912 following the Chinese invasion of Tibet at that time."It was within this view that a ten member committee was formed in Darjeeling to organise a rehabilitation centre to be known at the TIBETAN REFUGEE SELF HELP CENTRE. The founding members of the committee were: Mrs. Gyalo Thondup, President, Mr. T. Lawang, Mr. G. Tesur, Mr. Tenzing Norgay, Mr, & Mrs. Joksari, Mr. T. Tethong, Monsignor Benjamin, Mr. Chumbay Tsering and Miss Tesur. Later we had the pleasure of welcoming the following new members into the committee: Mrs. Laden-la, Col. & Mrs. Thapa and Mr. Dilip Bose." The centre was registered as charitable organization under the act of Government of India. Starting off with just four workers, today the centre is the home for 130 Tibetan family. The centre has been a part of multifarious activities which ranges from handicrafts, training of artisans, and craftsmen. These activities are primarily to the care of the sick, elders and needy destitute. The Centre now comprises one créche, one nursery school along with a pre-primary school (up to +2 standard).

 started on 1 October 1959
 production of handicrafts is the centre's main activity
June 1960, the Centre started a small Nursery School

References

External links

Darjeelingnews.net
Facts about Tibetan-Refugee Self Help

Tourist attractions in Darjeeling
Tibetan people
Refugees in India
Tibetan diaspora in India